Future Leaders of the World is a rock band formed in 2003. The band released their debut album, LVL IV in 2004, before going through a period of being named Machina, featuring former Evanescence members guitarist John LeCompt and drummer Rocky Gray. After a hiatus, the band reformed in 2014 and released another album under the "Future Leaders of the World" name, Reveal, in March 2015.

History

Formation and LVL IV 
Future Leaders of the World was formed by guitarist and singer Phil Taylor, who formed the group in Buffalo, New York with drummer Carl Messina and bassist Toby Cole. Taylor recorded a demo with Shawn Rivera of Az Yet and executive producer Allan Fray in Los Angeles. At a later time, Jake Stutevoss was also added on guitar. The group signed with Epic Records and released a full-length album, LVL IV. The album reached No. 153 on the Billboard 200 on the strength of the US hit singles "Let Me Out" (No. 6 Mainstream Rock, No. 32 Modern Rock Charts ) and "Everyday" (No. 30 Mainstream Rock). The group toured with groups such as Shinedown, Seether, Crossfade, Chevelle, and Alter Bridge, but during their dates on the Sno-Core tour, they learned that Epic planned to dissolve their contract, and the group disbanded.

Machina
Taylor and with former Evanescence members John LeCompt (guitar), Rocky Gray (drums), along with Jack Wiese (guitar) and Thad Ables (bass) formed a new band, Machina. Since the departure of Gray and LeCompt from Evanescence in May 2007, the band has kept up a relentless touring schedule and finished a full-length record produced and mixed by Toby Wright at the SoundKitchen in Nashville, TN. The lead single "Trust" received moderate airplay on radio stations across the US and has yet to release a second single.

In 2012, Machina has signed to Rogue Records America and released their debut album "To Live and Die in the Garden of Eden" on October 9 which is available in both digitally and physically on iTunes and CMDistro.com.

2009: The Return of Future Leaders of the World
After a brief hiatus the former vocalist Phil Taylor announced on the band's MySpace blog that he began the project again and the band reformed in 2009. The band released an EP titled Delirium with 3 tracks from the upcoming new full album titled Reveal.  This EP includes an acoustic version of "Let Me Out" as well.  The band's current line-up includes Jeremy "13" on bass, Ian Severson on guitar, Russell Bullock on drums, and frontman Phil Taylor. In 2014 the band struck a deal with Chicago-based label Pavement Entertainment/SonyRed. The new album Reveal, was released on March 10, 2015 led by the first single, "Live Again" on XM Sirius Radio. In support of the new album, the band engaged in a full winter tour with fellow rockers Saliva, as well as embarking upon on a tour of Japan and full USA tour to coincide with the release of Reveal. Currently, Future Leaders of the World lead vocalist/guitarist Phil Taylor has teamed up with Grammy-Nominated rock/pop drummer and percussionist Lester Estelle (Pillar, Kelly Clarkson) to record a new 7 song acoustic album this fall at, "Off The Wall Studios," w/ Grammy nominated, multi-platinum producer Robert Venable. The new album entitled, "RISE," via Label Group Ent/TaylorMaydMusik/INGROOVES Universal, will be released in December 2015 with a winter tour to follow in support.

Discography
Studio albums
LVL IV (2004)
To Live And Die in the Garden of Eden (as Machina) (2012)
Reveal (2015)

EPs
Machina EP (2007)
Delirium EP (2009)

Compilations
Bootlegs & B-Sides (2009)

Members
Machina
Phil Taylor – vocals
John LeCompt – guitar, backing vocals 
Thad Ables – bass
Rocky Gray – drums
 Jack Wiese – guitar

Future Leaders of the world
Phil Taylor – vocals, guitar, bass

Former members
Toby Cole – bass
Jake Stutevoss – guitar, backing vocals
Bill Hershey – bass
Carl Messina – drums
Jeremy "13" – bass
Erik McGreevy– bass
Ian Severson – guitar
Jarred Mosely – bass
Russell Bullock – drums
Justin  Carder  - drums

References

External links
Machina MySpace
Machina YouTube Channel
Machina Facebook
Machina Twitter
 Former EVANESCENCE Members Sign MACHINA Deal With ROGUE RECORDS - September 12, 2012 http://www.blabbermouth.net/news.aspx?mode=Article&newsitemID=179346
 Album Review of Machina’s To Live and Die in the Garden of Eden http://pittsburghmusicmagazine.com/2012/10/17/machinas-to-live-and-die-in-the-garden-of-eden/

American post-grunge musical groups
Rock music groups from Arkansas
Musical groups from Buffalo, New York
Musical groups from Little Rock, Arkansas
Rock music groups from New York (state)